Eleutherodactylus haitianus is a species of frog in the family Eleutherodactylidae endemic to the Cordillera Central, Dominican Republic, at elevations of  asl. Its natural habitat is high-elevation pine forest. It is locally common but patchily distributed. It is threatened by habitat loss caused by agriculture and by disturbance from ecotourism.

References

haitianus
Endemic fauna of the Dominican Republic
Amphibians of the Dominican Republic
Amphibians described in 1942
Taxonomy articles created by Polbot